Holyrood is a city in Ellsworth County, Kansas, United States.  As of the 2020 census, the population of the city was 403.

History
Holyrood was founded in 1874  and was established as a city in 1886. The original site of Holyrood was a half-mile south of Holyrood's present site. When settlers first moved into the area, dugout houses were the home of choice. The first settlers of Holyrood were Irish, but they were soon followed by people of German and Czech Origin. Some of the first names to appear in the area were Phelan, Corrigan, Schepmann, and Siemsen as noted in the St. Peter Lutheran Church's earliest records.

The first post office in Holyrood was established in June 1874, but the name of the post office was spelled Hollyrood. The name was changed on July 26, 1898. The first postmaster was John Corrigan who served for over four years. Corrigan hailed from Holyrood, Ontario, Canada. The name of Holyrood originally comes from Holyrood Abbey, today known as the Abbey and Palace of Holyroodhouse, in Edinburgh, Scotland.  Through Corrigan, the town can directly trace its name to the town of Holyrood, Ontario, Canada, a town settled by Scottish people.

During the first several decades of Holyrood's existence, church worship was held in the homes of local farmers, funerals were at the home of the deceased, and marriages were performed in the home of the bride's parents. In 1883, the first church of Holyrood was organized: the St. Peter's Lutheran Church. The first building for the Lutheran congregation was built one mile southeast of Holyrood. In 1908, the parsonage was moved into town.

To meet the needs of the Catholic settlers, St. Mary's Catholic Church was constructed. Date of construction is given as both 1886 and 1889. The Church was originally called The Church of the Holy Rood (Cross), but the name was later changed.

Next came the St. Paul's Evangelical church. Land for this church was bought on March 27, 1892, and constructing of the church was finished in September 1892. The church served its purpose for 35 years until it was dismantled and a new brick church was constructed in its place. The church was later renamed the United Church of Christ.

The first official school of Holyrood opened its doors in 1895 and catered to first through ninth grade. Before then, school was held in the homes of settlers or at the Lutheran Church. In 1906, a new school was constructed followed by another new elementary school in 1930. Holyrood High School was established in 1920.

Holyrood has had two local newspapers: The Holyrood Banner and the Holyrood Gazette. One of the most well known columns in the Holyrood Gazette was written by Leonard Sekavec and was known as "Sek's Appeal." The columns written by Sekavec had not only been printed in the Gazette, but also had been quoted in other newspapers including ones from New York and Los Angeles. Sekavec wrote the column for forty years and was also the editor of the Holyrood Gazette.

The city's current slogan is "A Little City with Lots of Pride."

Geography
Holyrood is located at  (38.587543, -98.412050).

Demographics

2010 census
As of the census of 2010, there were 447 people, 202 households, and 128 families residing in the city. The racial makeup of the city was 97.1% White, 0.4% Native American, 0.2% Asian, 0.2% from other races, and 2.0% from two or more races. Hispanic or Latino of any race were 0.7% of the population.

There were 202 households, of which 25.2% had children under the age of 18 living with them, 54.5% were married couples living together, 5.9% had a female householder with no husband present, 3.0% had a male householder with no wife present, and 36.6% were non-families. 34.2% of all households were made up of individuals, and 19.9% had someone living alone who was 65 years of age or older. The average household size was 2.21 and the average family size was 2.76.

The median age in the city was 49.4 years. 21.9% of residents were under the age of 18; 2.9% were between the ages of 18 and 24; 18.6% were from 25 to 44; 33.1% were from 45 to 64; and 23.5% were 65 years of age or older. The gender makeup of the city was 47.4% male and 52.6% female.

2000 census
As of the census of 2000, there were 464 people, 213 households, and 138 families residing in the city. The racial makeup of the city was 98.49% White, 1.08% from other races, and 0.43% from two or more races. Hispanic or Latino of any race were 2.16% of the population.

There were 213 households, out of which 25.4% had children under the age of 18 living with them, 56.8% were married couples living together, 5.6% had a female householder with no husband present, and 35.2% were non-families. 31.9% of all households were made up of individuals, and 20.7% had someone living alone who was 65 years of age or older. The average household size was 2.18 and the average family size was 2.72.

In the city, the population was spread out, with 20.5% under the age of 18, 6.9% from 18 to 24, 21.8% from 25 to 44, 25.2% from 45 to 64, and 25.6% who were 65 years of age or older. The median age was 45 years. For every 100 females, there were 93.3 males. For every 100 females age 18 and over, there were 85.4 males.

As of 2000 the median income for a household in the city was $31,354, and the median income for a family was $37,417. Males had a median income of $30,125 versus $23,625 for females. The per capita income for the city was $15,272. About 6.0% of families and 10.9% of the population were below the poverty line, including 14.0% of those under age 18 and 7.9% of those age 65 or over.

Government
The Holyrood government consists of a mayor and five council members.  The council meets the 1st and 3rd Monday of each month at 6:30 pm.
 City Hall, 110 S Main.

Education
The community is served by Central Plains USD 112 public school district and home to Central Plains Elementary School. The Central Plains High School mascot is Central Plains Oilers. The Oilers won the Kansas State High School 8-Man DII football championship in 2014.

Holyrood schools were closed through school unification. The Holyrood High School mascot was Holyrood Cardinals.

Notable people
 James Fugaté, author (as James Barr) of gay themed novels, plays, and articles
 Fay Thomas, baseball player

References

Further reading

External links
 City of Holyrood
 Holyrood - Directory of Public Officials
 Holyrood city map, KDOT

Cities in Kansas
Cities in Ellsworth County, Kansas